Krông Năng is a district (huyện) of Đắk Lắk province in the Central Highlands region of Vietnam.

As of 2003 the district had a population of 107,254, rising to 124,577 by 2018. The district covers an area of 620 km². The district capital lies at Krông Năng.

References

Districts of Đắk Lắk province